William Edward Adams was a footballer who played in The Football League for Walsall. He also played for West Bromwich Albion. He was born in Smethwick, England.

References

English footballers
Walsall F.C. players
West Bromwich Albion F.C. players
English Football League players
Year of birth missing
Year of death missing
20th-century British people
Association football defenders